Bury Grammar School Boys is a private day school in Bury, Greater Manchester, England, that has existed since c.1570.  It is now part of a group of schools for preschool, junior, senior and sixth form studies.

Since 2017, when Bury Grammar School (Boys) and Bury Grammar School (Girls) amalgamated, Jo Anderson has been the first Principal (education) of Bury Grammar School. The headmaster of the boys' school and vice principal since 2017 has been Devin Cassidy. The Principal is a member of the HMC. The current school fees are £10,992 p.a. for senior pupils and £8,193 p.a. in the junior school.

History 

There is evidence that a grammar school attached to Bury Parish Church existed as early as 1570 but the school was certainly well-established by 1634 with Henry Dunster as its fourth recorded headmaster. Former headmaster, Rev'd Henry Bury, who was by then "aged eighty nine yeares or thereabout", wrote his will in that year. In it, he not only left the sum of twenty shillings to Dunster ("that studious and painfull minister") but also an endowment of £300 to the "ffree school" at Bury "for and towards the yearlie mentayninge of a school maister there, for to teach their children."

Rev'd Roger Kay had gained his BA in 1688, his MA in 1691 and had become a Fellow of St John's College, Cambridge. He also later became Rector of Fittleton in Wiltshire and was a prebendary of Salisbury until his death. In 1726, he left money in his will to support the library at St John's College, but also a substantial part of his estate to re-founding his alma mater in his home town of Bury. The building in which Kay's newly re-founded school educated the boys of Bury still stands today, known as the Blackburn Hall, in the Wylde behind the Parish Church. (The hall is named after a former Rector of Bury, Ven. Foster Blackburne MA(Oxon), who was also Archdeacon of Manchester and Chairman of Governors of Bury G S. Archdeacon Blackburn was credited with producing the lyrics for a school song. It is not used as the official school song today.)

The school outgrew its premises and, in 1903, the boys moved into the completed half of a new building on Tenterden Street, with playing fields across Bridge Road. The new buildings, of Accrington brick, were designed in a simple Neo-Renaissance style by William Venn Gough.(The playing fields were a bone of contention from the first. One writer noted in an early edition of "The Clavian" that the young folks of Bury refused to recognize our right to the ground.

The boys were soon joined by the girls of the Bury Girls' High School, newly re-founded as Bury Grammar School for Girls. The two schools, whilst remaining separate entities, shared the same building until the erection of a more modern facility for the boys across Bridge Road in the 1960s. This new boys' school was built on the playing fields, so the Governors purchased  of land at Buckley Wells for new playing fields. When a new courthouse was completed on Tenters Street, the Magistrates' Court and County Court vacated their former building on Tenterden Street.  The Prep Department of the boys' school moved across the road from the 1960s building into the refurbished old courthouse.

The school was a direct grant grammar school from 1944 until the abolition of the direct grant system in 1976, when it became fully independent once again. The school celebrated the 250th anniversary of its re-founding by Roger Kay with a visit from Prince Philip on 19 November 1976.

Bury Grammar Schools celebrate their Founders' Day on the Friday closest to 6 May (the Feast of St John before the Latin Gate), the date on which Roger Kay specified the Trustees should meet annually to inspect the schools. The Eucharist is celebrated in the Parish Church and, later in the morning, a procession leads from the school through the main streets of Bury to the Parish Church, led by the Combined Cadet Force (CCF). Since the CCF (founded 1892) is attached to the Lancashire Fusiliers, a regiment with the Freedom of the Borough, the cadets are permitted to march with "swords drawn, drums beating and colours flying". After a commemoration service, the pupils are awarded a half-holiday. Services for younger pupils are held simultaneously in the boys' school hall, the boys' preparatory school and the Roger Kay Hall (in the girls' school).

Crest 

The school's crest dates from c.1840. Both are considered to have been created by Rev'd Henry Crewe Boutflower, headmaster 1823–58. The tenacious swan was used by John, Duke of Berry in the manuscripts known as the Très Riches Heures. Berry may have been an ancestor of Henry Bury, but was more likely chosen due to the similarity in their names, whilst the key is believed to be a play on the name of the re-founder, Roger Kay.

In a letter to the editor in the first edition of the Bury Grammar School Magazine of September 1881, a correspondent asked:

The following edition carried a reply:

Thus began references to the swan of Bury as The Irwell Duck.

Houses 
The school has four houses, whose colours are reflected in the colour of the badge and the stripes of the tie in the school uniforms. Three houses were created in 1905 by Rev'd W H Howlett to re-introduce some of the camaraderie of a boarding school into the academic and sporting life of what was, by this time, a day school. The three houses were:
 Derby; named after Frederick Stanley, 16th Earl of Derby, donor of the land upon which the school stands and of considerable sums of money for the erection of the present girls' school building.
 Hulme; named after the Manchester lawyer and landowners, William Hulme and his Hulme Trust which helped to fund the new building.
 Kay; named after Rev'd Roger Kay, re-founder of the school.
In 1919, an additional house was introduced:
 Howlett; named after Fr Howlett himself.

Curriculum 

Boys in the prep school, housed in its own building across Tenterden Street, study the subjects of the National Curriculum – the core subjects of English, mathematics and general science, together with art, DT, geography, history, ICT, French, music, PSHEE and RS. In addition, all boys have PPE, Swimming and Games on their timetable.

All boys study English language, English literature, maths and chemistry, biology and physics as individual subjects. Boys must also take either French, German or Spanish. Latin used to be compulsory in the first, second and third forms. In addition to these compulsory subjects, boys opt for a combination of other subjects from a range including art, business studies, electronics, geography, history, ICT, music, PE and RS.

GCSE examinations are taken in the 5th Year, including French, German and Spanish. Pupils sit the IGCSE mathematics, English language and English literature examinations, administered by Edexcel. Subsequently, the media report the school as having a 0% pass rate at GCSE in maths and English, since IGCSEs are not counted as GCSE passes by the Office for National Statistics.

Having successfully completed their GCSEs in the 5th year, boys may opt to stay on into the 6th form for a further two years. Sixth form teaching offers study towards 'A' level in all of the subjects offered at GCSE, along with geology, economics, further maths, philosophy, politics and psychology (which is taught in the girls' school).

Extra curricular

Sport 
PE and games lessons are part of every boy's timetable, but there is a range of opportunities for extra curricular sport in the school. Sports offered include Association football, athletics, badminton, basketball, cricket, fencing, hockey, gymnastics, Rugby football and tennis. The school has a swimming pool and a large sports hall with weights room. Summer 2016 saw the addition of a series of all-weather playing surfaces between the sports hall and the river.  Boys play competitively both in inter-house competitions and in extramural matches, as well as sending representatives to regional and national teams, such as the ISFA.

Performing arts 
The school has a long tradition of musical and dramatic performance, with performances of Oliver Goldsmith's She Stoops to Conquer noted in The Clavian of 1912 whilst a "little musical programme was put together" for a "Kay House Social" in July of the same year. The 1974 production of Dry Rot, starring John Darling and Piggy Hyde, was the favourite of that decade. Today, the school has a full spectrum of musical groups including a brass ensemble, senior and junior choirs, a concert band, an orchestra and a percussion group. The CCF has a corps of drums.  Dramatic productions include both junior and senior plays, and musical productions; such performances are often produced in conjunction with the girls' school, and in recent years have included Guys and Dolls, Les Miserables, Little Shop of Horrors and Jesus Christ, Superstar.

Clubs and societies 
The first debating society was established at the school in 1907. There is a range of societies available to the Clavian of today including the ever-present chess club, photography club and debating society.

Publications and alumni activities 

There are extant copies of a school magazine dating back as far as 1881. The current magazine (The Clavian) began as a termly in-house pamphlet in 1906 and is now an annual publication. "The Key" is a magazine produced for Alumni and friends of the school by the Development Office.

There is an active alumni group run by the Development Office and membership of the Bury Grammar Schools' Alumni Group on LinkedIn is open to Old Clavians (and Old Claviennes) who are LinkedIn members.

The Old Boys' Society has long held an Annual Dinner; the first recorded such dinner took place on 12 September 1881, after the Old Clavians -v- 1st XI cricket match. (Toasts included "The Bishop and Clergy", "The Army, Navy and Auxiliary Forces" and "The Masters".) The OBS today still organises an annual dinner, held at the school on Founders' Day each year. The Old Boys' Society (London Branch) organises an annual dinner in London for Home Counties-based Old Boys. Previously held on 6 May annually, in recent years it has moved to a Friday later in May.

The society also runs several sports teams for Old Clavians, including an association football club that fields four teams; 1st XI, Reserves, 3rd XI and Veterans.

Inter school co-operation 

There is a single board of governors for the boys' and girls' schools. They are also served by a single Bursar/Clerk to the Governors and development office. There is a tradition of boys and girls uniting for dramatic productions and musical concerts and, since 1992, membership of the boys' school CCF has been open to members of the girls' school. The imminent completion of a joint sixth form centre will mean that some 'A' level subjects can be taught jointly across the two schools.

Link with Harvard College and the Henry Dunster Society 

The Henry Dunster Society, an organisation inaugurated at Harvard University in September 2008, is intended to bring together former pupils of the Bury Grammar Schools and to support initiatives for the schools. Henry Dunster was a pupil of Bury Grammar School, and then a student at Magdalene College, Cambridge. He became the curate of Bury Parish Church, and then the fourth headmaster of the school. He emigrated to Massachusetts in 1640 and was appointed the first president of Harvard College, now Harvard University.

Notable masters 
Henry Dunster (1609–1659), first president of Harvard College. A native of Bury and Old Clavian, he was the fourth headmaster of the school prior to his emigration to Massachusetts in 1640.
John Just (1797–1852), Second Master 1832–52.  A noted botanist, he lectured at the Royal Manchester School of Medicine and Surgery, and was honorary professor of botany at the Royal Manchester Institution.

Notable Old Clavians

See also 
 Bury Grammar School (Girls)
 Hulme Trust

Notes

References

External links 

 Bury Grammar School (Boys)
 Bury Grammar Schools' Development Office
 Bury Grammar School (Girls)

Boys' schools in Greater Manchester
Private schools in the Metropolitan Borough of Bury
Schools in Bury, Greater Manchester
Secondary schools in the Metropolitan Borough of Bury
Member schools of the Headmasters' and Headmistresses' Conference
 
Educational institutions established in the 1570s
16th-century establishments in England
Diamond schools
Hulme Trust